= 2027 Piala Presiden (Indonesia) =

Piala Presiden
2027 Indonesia President's Cup

Tournament details
- Country: Indonesia
- Dates: TBD
- Teams: TBD

The 2027 Piala Presiden (English: 2027 Indonesia President's Cup) is the upcoming ninth edition of Piala Presiden, held by the PSSI as a pre-season friendly tournament.

== Competition format changes ==
PSSI announced that starting in 2027, Piala Presiden would invite predominantly national teams to play against the Indonesian national team in a similar format to the King's Cup in Thailand and Pre-season cup national team friendlies.
